Downtown Pittsburgh, colloquially referred to as the Golden Triangle, and officially the Central Business District, is the urban downtown center of Pittsburgh. It is located at the confluence of the Allegheny River and the Monongahela River whose joining forms the Ohio River. The triangle is bounded by the two rivers. 

The area features offices for major corporations such as PNC Bank, U.S. Steel, PPG, Bank of New York Mellon, Heinz, Federated Investors, and Alcoa. It is where the fortunes of such industrial barons as Andrew Carnegie, Henry Clay Frick, Henry J. Heinz, Andrew Mellon and George Westinghouse were made. It contains the site where the French fort, Fort Duquesne, once stood.

Location 
The Central Business District is bounded by the Monongahela River to the south, the Allegheny River to the north, and I-579 (Crosstown Boulevard) to the east. An expanded definition of Downtown may include the adjacent neighborhoods of Uptown/The Bluff, the Strip District, the North Shore, and the South Shore.

Transportation

Public transportation 
Downtown is served by the Port Authority's light rail subway system (known locally as the "T"), an extensive bus network, and two inclines (Duquesne Incline and Monongahela Incline). The Downtown portion of the subway has the following stations:

T Stations
 Station Square on the South Shore in the Station Square development (street-level station)
 First Avenue near First Avenue & Ross Street, Downtown (elevated station)
 Steel Plaza at Sixth Avenue & Grant Street, Downtown (underground station)
 Penn Plaza near Liberty Avenue & Grant Street, Downtown (underground, limited service)
 Wood Street at the triangular intersection of Wood Street, Sixth Avenue, and Liberty Avenue, Downtown (underground station)
 Gateway Center at Liberty Avenue & Stanwix Street, Downtown (underground station)
 North Side near General Robinson Street & Tony Dorsett Drive on the North Shore (underground station)
 Allegheny near Allegheny Avenue & Reedsdale Street on the North Shore (elevated station)

Downtown is also home to the Pittsburgh Amtrak train station connecting Pittsburgh with New York City, Philadelphia, and Washington, D.C. to the east and Cleveland and Chicago to the west. Greyhound's Pittsburgh bus terminal is located across Liberty Avenue from the Amtrak Station, in the Grant Street Transportation Center building.

Highways 
Major roadways serving Downtown from the suburbs include the "Parkway East" (I-376) from Monroeville, the "Parkway West" (I-376) from the airport area, and the "Parkway North" (I-279) from the North Hills, and (I-579) in Downtown Pittsburgh. Other important roadways are Pennsylvania Route 28, Pennsylvania Route 51, Pennsylvania Route 65, and U.S. Route 19.

Three major entrances to the city are via tunnels: the Fort Pitt Tunnel and Squirrel Hill Tunnel on I-376 and the Liberty Tunnels. The New York Times once called Pittsburgh "the only city with an entrance," specifically referring to the view of Downtown that explodes upon drivers immediately upon exiting the Fort Pitt Tunnel. Also traveling I-279 south and I-376, the city "explodes into view" when coming around a turn in the highway.

Local streets 

Downtown surface streets are based on two distinct grid systems that parallel the Allegheny and Monongahela rivers.  These two grids intersect along Liberty Avenue, creating many unusual street intersections. Furthermore, the Allegheny grid contains numbered streets, while the Monongahela grid contains numbered avenues.  And, in fact, there are cases where these numbered roadways intersect, creating some confusion (i.e. the intersection of Liberty Avenue and 7th Street/6th Avenue).  This unusual grid pattern leads to Pittsburghers giving directions in the terms of landmarks, rather than turn-by-turn directions.

Bridges 

Pittsburgh is nicknamed "The City of Bridges". In Downtown, there are 10 bridges (listed below) connecting to points north and south. The expanded definition of Downtown (including the aforementioned surrounding neighborhoods) includes 18 bridges. Citywide there are 446 bridges. In Allegheny County the number exceeds 2,200.

Downtown Bridges

 Fort Pitt Bridge carries I-376 (Previously I-279) between Downtown and the Fort Pitt Tunnel
 Fort Duquesne Bridge carries I-279 between Downtown and the North Shore
 Smithfield Street Bridge carries Smithfield Street between Downtown and the South Shore
 Panhandle Bridge carries the city's light rail transit system between Downtown and the South Shore
 Liberty Bridge connects the Liberty Tunnel to I-579 Downtown
 Roberto Clemente Bridge (formerly 6th St Bridge) connects 6th Street Downtown to Federal Street on the North Shore at PNC Park
 Andy Warhol Bridge (formerly 7th St Bridge) connects 7th Street Downtown to Sandusky Street on the North Shore at the Andy Warhol Museum
 Rachel Carson Bridge (formerly 9th St Bridge) connects 9th Street Downtown to Anderson Street on the North Shore
 Fort Wayne Railroad Bridge carries freight and Amtrak trains from Downtown to the North Shore
 Veterans Bridge carries I-579 from Downtown to the North Side

Bridges of Expanded Downtown
 West End Bridge carries US Route 19 from the West End/South Shore to the North Shore/North Side just west of Downtown
 16th Street Bridge carries 16th Street from the Strip District to Chestnut Street on the North Side
 West Penn Bridge (pedestrian/bike-only) is part of the Three Rivers Heritage Trail connecting the North Side to Washington's Landing on Herr's Island
 30th Street Bridge connects River Avenue on the North Side with Waterfront Drive on Washington's Landing at Herr's Island
 31st Street Bridge connects PA Route 28 on the North Side with 31st Street in the Strip District
 33rd Street Railroad Bridge connects the North Side to the Strip District and crosses Herr's Island
 South 10th Street Bridge connects the Armstrong Tunnel at Second Avenue just east of Downtown with the South Side at South 10th Street
 Birmingham Bridge connects East Carson Street on the South Side with Fifth and Forbes avenues in Uptown

Downtown districts 
Downtown contains a wealth of historic, cultural, and entertainment sites. While most people still consider the entire Downtown as one neighborhood, there are several significant subdistricts within the Golden Triangle.

 The Pittsburgh Central Downtown Historic District is a historic district in the central business district. It is bounded by Wood Street, Forbes Avenue, Grant Street, and Liberty Avenue. It was listed on the National Register of Historic Places (NRHP) on December 17, 1985.
 Point State Park area: At the triangle's tip is Point State Park with its giant fountain and the Fort Pitt Museum. This park was the original site of both Fort Duquesne by the French and the subsequent Fort Pitt by the British.
 The Cultural District along Penn and Liberty avenues on the Allegheny River includes numerous theaters, galleries, and concert halls including Heinz Hall, Byham Theater, O'Reilly Theater, Benedum Center, and Wood Street Galleries as well as restaurants and housing. The Penn-Liberty Historic District encompasses the Penn & Liberty avenue corridor in the Cultural District.
 The Fifth & Forbes Corridor is Downtown's shopping district along Fifth and Forbes avenues and includes historic Market Square. Downtown is home to numerous independent retailers plus large retailers such as Burlington Coat Factory and Brooks Brothers.
 The Grant Street area is the seat of Pittsburgh's and Allegheny County's government and is also a prestigious corporate address with many of the city's tallest skyscrapers.
 The Firstside neighborhood along the Boulevard of the Allies and Fort Pitt Boulevard adjacent to the Monongahela River is an educational and residential district. It is home to Point Park University and the Art Institute of Pittsburgh both of which have high-rise student housing in the neighborhood. Numerous other residential projects are also under construction in this neighborhood.

Economy 

Downtown Pittsburgh retains substantial economic influence, ranking at 25th in the nation for jobs within the urban core and 6th in job density.

University of Pittsburgh economist Christopher Briem notes that the level of employment in the city has remained largely constant for the past 50 years: "[the] time series of jobs located in the City proper are about as stable as any economic metric in the region, or in any other Northeastern US urban core, over many decades. In 1958, [there were] 294,000 jobs located in the city proper…Those numbers are virtually identical today which tells me there is a certain limit to how many jobs can efficiently be located in what are some relatively (very) constrained areas." These numbers reflect employment in the city as a whole, not just the central business district; but the central business district has the highest density of employment of any Pittsburgh neighborhood.

Pittsburgh has long been a headquarters city, with numerous national and global corporations calling the Golden Triangle home. Currently, Downtown is still home to a large number of Fortune 500 companies (7 in the metro area, 5 of which are in the city in 2022, which ranks Pittsburgh high nationally in Fortune 500 headquarters):
 Kraft Heinz
– co-headquartered in PPG Place
 PNC Financial Services
– headquartered in the Tower at PNC Plaza
 PPG Industries
– headquartered in PPG Place
 WESCO International
– headquartered at Station Square
 U.S. Steel
– headquartered at the US Steel Tower

Downtown is also home to GNC, Dollar Bank, Equitable Resources, Duquesne Light, Federated Investors and Highmark as well as the regional headquarters for Citizens Bank, Ariba, and Dominion Resources. Regional healthcare giant UPMC has its corporate headquarters in the US Steel Tower.

Major buildings 

 11 Stanwix Street
 525 William Penn Place
 Allegheny County Courthouse
 Benedum Center
 BNY Mellon Center
 Byham Theater
 City-County Building
 David L. Lawrence Convention Center
 EQT Plaza
 Heinz Hall
 Fifth Avenue Place
 Federated Tower
 First Presbyterian Church of Pittsburgh
 Frick Building
 Gateway Center
 Grant Building
 Gulf Tower
 K&L Gates Center
 Koppers Tower
 O'Reilly Theater
 Oxford Centre
 Penn Station
 One PNC Plaza
 Two PNC Plaza
 Three PNC Plaza
 Trinity Cathedral, downtown
 PPG Place
 Regional Enterprise Tower
 Union Trust Building
 US Steel Tower
 William S. Moorhead Federal Building

Hotels 
Downtown is home to the following hotels:

 Wyndham Grand Pittsburgh Downtown
 Omni William Penn
 Pittsburgh Marriott City Center
 Renaissance Pittsburgh
 Fairmont Pittsburgh
 Westin Convention Center Hotel
 Doubletree Pittsburgh City Center
 Courtyard by Marriott Downtown
 Cambria Suites Pittsburgh
 Embassy Suites (opens 2015)
 Drury Hotel (opens 2015)
 Hilton Garden Inn (under construction)
 Hampton Inn & Suites (located on the edge of the Strip District)
 Sheraton Station Square (located in the South Shore's Station Square)
 SpringHill Suites (located on the North Shore)
 Hyatt Place (located on the North Shore)
 Residence Inn by Marriott (located on the North Shore)
 Holiday Inn Express (located on the South Side)
 Distrikt Hotel

Parks and plazas 

Downtown is home to numerous parks, large and small:
 Point State Park at the tip of the Golden Triangle
 Mellon Square located in the square between Oliver & Sixth avenues and Smithfield Street and William Penn Place
 Market Square at Forbes Avenue & Market Street
 Mellon Green located at Grant Street & Sixth Avenue
 FirstSide Park located between Grant & Ross streets and First & Second avenues.
 Gateway Center plazas located around the Gateway Center skyscrapers near Liberty Avenue & Stanwix Street
 Plaza at PPG Place near Third Avenue & Market Street
 US Steel Tower Plaza at Grant Street & Sixth Avenue
 Katz Plaza at Penn Avenue & Seventh Street
 Triangle Park bounded by Liberty Avenue, Fifth Avenue & Market Street
 Allegheny Riverfront Park along the Allegheny River below Fort Duquesne Boulevard
 Mon Wharf Landing along the Monongahela River below Fort Pitt Boulevard (under construction)
 North Shore Riverfront Park opposite Downtown along the Allegheny and Ohio rivers, part of the larger Three Rivers Park

Educational facilities 
While Pittsburgh's Oakland neighborhood is known as the educational center of the city, Downtown is home to several higher education institutions as well as a branch of the city's Carnegie Library system and a Pittsburgh Public Schools 6–12 school:
 Point Park University
 The Art Institute of Pittsburgh
 Le Cordon Bleu Institute of Culinary Arts (also known as Pennsylvania Culinary Institute)
 Robert Morris University's Downtown branch
 Pittsburgh Creative and Performing Arts 6–12
 City Charter High School

Residential areas
Downtown has several condos, including Gateway Towers and Chatham Place dating to the 1960s  and more modern structures as well.  There are over 5,000 apartment and condo units in Greater Downtown Pittsburgh.

Surrounding neighborhoods 
 The Bluff/Uptown
 Crawford-Roberts neighborhood in the Hill District
 North Shore (across the Allegheny River)
 South Shore (across the Monongahela River)
 South Side Flats (across the Monongahela River)
 Strip District

See also 
 List of Pittsburgh neighborhoods

References

Further reading 
 
 Michael Pellas (2015). Why We Live in Downtown Pittsburgh

External links 
 Downtown Pittsburgh

 
 Interactive Pittsburgh Neighborhoods Map

 
Neighborhoods in Pittsburgh
Economy of Pittsburgh
Pittsburgh History & Landmarks Foundation Historic Landmarks
Pittsburgh
Academic enclaves
Shopping districts and streets in the United States